Burundi first participated at the Olympic Games in 1996, and has sent athletes to compete in every Summer Olympic Games since then.  The nation has never participated in the Winter Olympic Games.

Vénuste Niyongabo won a gold medal in athletics in the 1996 Games, and Francine Niyonsaba added a silver 20 years later.

The National Olympic Committee for Burundi was created in 1990 and recognized by the International Olympic Committee in 1993.

Medal tables

Medals by Summer Games

Medals by sport

List of medalists

See also
 List of flag bearers for Burundi at the Olympics
 :Category:Olympic competitors for Burundi
 Burundi at the Paralympics

External links
 
 
 

 
Olympics